Újezd is a municipality and village in Zlín District in the Zlín Region of the Czech Republic. It has about 1,200 inhabitants.

References

External links

Villages in Zlín District